Na białym szlaku is a 1962 Polish drama film directed by Jarosław Brzozowski and Andrzej Wróbel.

Cast
 Leon Niemczyk as Sikora
 Emil Karewicz as Oberleutnant Weber
 Ryszard Kotys as Bjorn
 Kazimierz Talarczyk as Olaf Peterson
 Bożena Kurowska
 Robert Rogalski
 Witold Pyrkosz
 Kazimierz Wilamowski
 Jerzy Krasowski as Hans
 Barbara Połomska
 Adam Pawlikowski

References

External links
 

1962 films
1962 drama films
Polish drama films
Polish black-and-white films
1960s Polish-language films